Into the Void is a video game developed by American studio Adrenalin Entertainment and published by Playmates Interactive Entertainment for DOS in 1997.

Gameplay
Into the Void is a science fiction turn-based strategy game in which the player colonizes planets and destroys rival civilizations to establish an empire.

Reception
Next Generation reviewed the PC version of the game, rating it three stars out of five, and stated that "While it doesn't break a whole lot of new ground, Into the Void is a solid enough game that should please most."

Reviews
Computer Gaming World #155 (Jun 1997)
PC Games - May, 1997
PC Player (Germany) - Jun, 1997
GameSpot - Mar 08, 1997
GameRevolution - Jun 05, 2004

References

1997 video games
4X video games
DOS games
DOS-only games
Video games developed in the United States
Video games set in outer space